Events in the year 1952 in the Republic of India.

Incumbents
 President of India – Rajendra Prasad
 Prime Minister of India – Jawaharlal Nehru
 Vice President of India – Sarvepalli Radhakrishnan
 Chief Justice of India – M. Patanjali Sastri

Governors
 Assam – Jairamdas Daulatram
 Bihar – Madhav Shrihari Aney (until 15 June), R. R. Diwakar (starting 15 June)
 Maharashtra – Raja Sir Maharaj Singh
 Odisha – Asaf Ali (until 6 June), Fazal Ali (starting 7 June)
 Punjab – Chandulal Madhavlal Trivedi
 Rajasthan – Maharaj Man Singh II
 Uttar Pradesh – Hormasji Pherozeshah Modi (until 1 June), Kanhaiyalal Maneklal Munshi (starting 1 June)
 West Bengal – Kailash Nath Katju (until 1 November), Harendra Coomar Mookerjee (starting 1 November)

Events
National income - 106,634 million

January - June 
 21 February - 1951–52 Indian general election concludes.
 3 April - Rajya Sabha constituted with 216 members and Sarvepalli Radhakrishnan as the Chairman of Rajya Sabha. 12 members were nominated by the President of India and remaining were elected through 1952 Indian Rajya Sabha elections.
 15 April - The Indian National Congress headed by Jawaharlal Nehru sweeps into power.
 17 April – Membership of the 1st Lok Sabha starts.
 13 May – Jawaharlal Nehru forms his first government.
 13 May – First Lok Sabha, Rajya Sabha session commenced.
 15 May – G.V. Mavlankar handles the charge as Speaker of the Lok Sabha.
 30 May – M. A. Ayyangar handles the charge as Lok Sabha Deputy Speaker.

June - December 
 26 July - Commencement of 1952 Mulkhi Agitation at Warangal.
 16 October - The first ever Test cricket match of India national cricket team post independence was held at Feroz Shah Kotla Ground against Pakistan national cricket team.
 December - Jawaharlal Nehru's visit to Travancore–Cochin results in commencement of Nehru Trophy Boat Race.
 The commencement of Indo-Norwegian Project.

Births
18 January – Veerappan, bandit (died 2004).
3 February – Deepti Naval, actress.
19 March – Mohan Babu, actor, producer and politician.
31 March – Letika Saran, former Director General of Police, Tamil Nadu, India.
25 April – Brij Narayan, sarod player
30 May – Ambareesh, actor and politician. (died 2018)
20 June – Vikram Seth, poet, novelist, travel writer, librettist, children's writer, biographer and memoirist.
23 June – Raj Babbar, actor.
27 June – Kamalesh Chandra Chakrabarty, banker (died 2021)
29 July – Harshad Mehta, stockbroker (died 2001)
25 August  Vijayakanth, actor and politician
4 September – Rishi Kapoor, actor. (died 2020) 
15 September – K. Vijay Kumar, retired IPS officer.
13 December  Lakshmi, actress.
18 December – Noor Alam Khalil Amini, Sunni Muslim scholar (died 2021)
28 December – Hemant Shesh Hindi poet, editor, art critic

Full date unknown
Urvashi Butalia, historian, feminist, and publisher.
Daisy Irani, actress.
Deepak Kumar, historian and philosopher of science.

Deaths
7 March – Paramahansa Yogananda, yogi and guru (born 1893).
Rashid Jahan, author, short story writer and playwright (born 1905).

See also 
 List of Bollywood films of 1952

References

 
1950s in India
India
Years of the 20th century in India
India